Hopkins Township may refer to the following places in the United States:

 Hopkins Township, Whiteside County, Illinois
 Hopkins Township, Michigan
 Hopkins Township, Nodaway County, Missouri

Township name disambiguation pages